Cladonia glauca or the glaucous cup lichen is a species of fruticose, cup lichen in the family Cladoniaceae. Found in Europe, it was formally described as a new species in 1828 by German botanist Heinrich Gustav Flörke. The nematodes Aphelenchoides lichenicola and Ottolenchus cabi feed on this lichen.

See also
List of Cladonia species

References

glauca
Lichen species
Lichens described in 1828
Lichens of Europe
Taxa named by Heinrich Gustav Flörke